Alexia Khadime (born 9 June 1983) is a British actress and mezzo-soprano, known for her roles in musical theatre and television.

Career

Theatre
Khadime made her first appearance on the stage in 1999, when she appeared in "Cinderella" at the Hackney Empire, and the following year, she took part in the UK Tour Leader of the Pack.

She made her West End debut aged 17, appearing as part of the ensemble in The Lion King in 2001, additionally providing cover for the role of "Nala". In 2003, she appeared in the UK Tour of Whistle Down the Wind, playing the role of "Candy". In 2004, she returned to The Lion King – this time playing "Nala" as the lead, and she remained in the role until 2008.

In early 2008, she successfully auditioned for the lead role of "Elphaba" in the musical Wicked. She began performances on her 25th birthday, and played the role for six months (temporarily replacing Kerry Ellis who was playing a limited engagement with the Broadway Company). Khadime left Wicked in November 2008, but returned in May 2009 when Ellis left the company. Throughout both of her spells in Wicked, Khadime played alongside Dianne Pilkington as "Glinda". In 2009, the pair were honoured at the "Woman of the Future Awards" in the Arts & Culture category. Khadime's run in Wicked came to an end in March 2010 when she was succeeded by Rachel Tucker. As of 2021, Khadime is the only black woman to play the role of Elphaba full-time in any production of Wicked.

After concluding her time in Wicked, she next appeared in the straight play Welcome to Thebes at the Royal National Theatre through the Summer of 2010, before returning to musical theatre, playing "Deb" in Ordinary Days at London's Trafalgar Studios in February and March 2011.

In June 2011, she replaced Samantha Barks in the iconic role of "Éponine" in the London production of Les Misérables. She played the role for just short of a year, before being succeeded by Danielle Hope.

In late 2012, Khadime joined the original West End company of The Book of Mormon, playing the role of "Nabulungi", with performances starting in February 2013. She won the fan voted 2014 WhatsOnStage.com Award for "Best Supporting Actress in a Musical" for her portrayal of Nabulungi, as well as the West End Wilma award for "Best Supporting Cast Member". Her last performance in The Book of Mormon was on 30 January 2016.

Khadime played the role of Miriam in The Prince of Egypt on the stage of the Dominion Theatre, London's West End.

On 7 March 2023, Khadime returned to Wicked opposite Lucy St. Louis as Glinda, marking the first time in history that both roles are being played by black actresses simultaneously.

Television
As a young actress, Khadime made her first television appearance in 1996, appearing in an episode of the BBC's The Sculptress. She appeared in Grange Hill for two years, and in 1998, had a regular role as "Tanisha" in children's ITV series Comin' Atcha! In 1999, she appeared as "Ellie Burns" in the BBC's The Queen's Nose, and has additional credits in The Bill, Class Action, and Sky One's Dream Team.

While appearing in Les Misérables in 2012, Khadime made a special guest appearance on RTÉ's OMG! Jedward's Dream Factory, when 11-year-old Aoife Dardis received her wish to see Les Misérables in London, and to meet Khadime, her favourite actress. Khadime also had a regular role in the children's gameshow Splatalot!, playing "Madeva", a defender. She also voices Sardonyx in the Cartoon Network series Steven Universe.

Film
Along with fellow Wicked alumni Kerry Ellis and Dianne Pilkington, Khadime appeared as a wench in the 2012 movie edition of Les Misérables. On 9 June, Khadime's birthday, The film adaptation of London Road Directed by Rufus Norris was previewed, where she appeared in a cameo role of "Radio Techy."

Music
In February 2003, credited simply as "Alexia", Khadime released a single entitled "Ring" through Virgin Records. It entered the UK Singles Chart at No. 48. In 2008, she recorded a duet with Ben James-Ellis entitled "Enchanted" for the album Act One – Songs From The Musicals of Alexander S. Bermange. In 2011, along with her Ordinary Days co-star Daniel Boys, Khadime contributed the duet "Looking Back" to Michael Bruce's "Unwritten Songs". Her voice can also be heard on the film soundtracks for Pride and Amazing Grace.

References

External links
 Alexia Khadime
 Alexia Khadime at Amanda Howard Associates (agent)
 Wicked West End site
 Interview with Alexia Khadime
 ATN Interview with Alexia Khadime, Wicked
 BWW INTERVIEWS: Alexia Khadime, London's Elphaba In WICKED

English stage actresses
English musical theatre actresses
English women singers
Living people
1983 births
Black British actresses
English people of Nigerian descent
People educated at Susi Earnshaw Theatre School